The Seth Lore and Irwinton Historic District is a historic district in Eufaula, Barbour County, Alabama.  It was listed on the National Register of Historic Places in 1986.

With over 700 historic and architecturally significant structures, the district includes Alabama's most coherent collection of intact mid-to-late 19th century small town commercial buildings, as well as the state's most extensive collection of domestic Italianate architecture.  The period of architectural, commercial, industrial and political significance is from 1825 to 1949.  Architectural styles include Bungalow/Craftsman, Late Victorian, Classical Revival, Gothic Revival, and Greek Revival.

Photo gallery

See also
National Register of Historic Places listings in Barbour County, Alabama
James L. Pugh

References

External links

 Eufaula, Alabama Visitor's Guide (Eufaula/Barbour Chamber of Commerce)

National Register of Historic Places in Barbour County, Alabama
Historic districts in Barbour County, Alabama
Italianate architecture in Alabama
Neoclassical architecture in Alabama
American Craftsman architecture in Alabama
Historic districts on the National Register of Historic Places in Alabama